The calcareous sponges of class Calcarea are members of the animal phylum Porifera, the cellular sponges. They are characterized by spicules made of calcium carbonate in the form of calcite or aragonite. While the spicules in most species have three points, in some species they have either two or four points.

Biology
All sponges in this class are strictly marine, and, while they are distributed worldwide, most are found in shallow tropical waters. Like nearly all other sponges, they are sedentary filter feeders.

All three sponge body plans are represented within class Calcarea : asconoid, syconoid, and leuconoid. However, a few brightly coloured species are also known.

Calcareous sponges vary from radially symmetrical vase-shaped body types to colonies made up of a meshwork of thin tubes, or irregular massive forms. The skeleton has either a mesh or honeycomb structure.

Classification
Of the 15,000 or so species of Porifera that exist, only 400 of those are calcareans.

Calcarean sponges first appeared during the Cambrian, and their diversity was greatest during the Cretaceous period. Recent molecular analysis suggests the class Calcarea should be designated as a phylum, in particular the first to have diverged in the Animalia.

The calcareous sponges are divided into two subclasses and six orders:

Class Calcarea
 Subclass Calcinea
 Order Clathrinida
 Order Murrayonida
 Subclass Calcaronea
 Order Baerida
 Order Leucosolenida
 Order Lithonida
 Order Pharetronida†

References

External links
UCMP: Calcarea

 
Taxa named by James Scott Bowerbank